Parkville High School (PHS) is a four-year public high school in Baltimore County, Maryland, United States. The school was originally established in 1953 on what is now the location of Parkville Middle School. The current high school building opened in 1961. Area middle schools include Parkville Middle, Loch Raven Academy, and Pine Grove Middle.

About the school
The school is located just northeast of Baltimore City.  It is on the inside of the Baltimore Beltway, on Putty Hill Avenue, just west of Harford Road Maryland Route 147, and east of Old Harford Road.  Parkville High School at its current location opened in September 1958. The school boundaries border Towson High School, Loch Raven High School, Perry Hall High School, and Overlea High School.

In 2007, Parkville High School was named one of the best 1300 schools in America. An extensive, $40  million renovation project began in 2014 to air condition the building, refurbish the exterior, and remodel much of the interior space.

Parkville has a magnet program for mathematics, science, and computer science. It is also the only high school in Baltimore County and Baltimore City that has German World Language classes.

Academics
Parkville High school received a 40.3 out of a possible 97 points (41%) on the 2018-2019 Maryland State Department of Education Report Card and received a 2 out of 5 star rating, ranking in the 16th percentile among all Maryland schools.

Students
The 2019–2020 enrollment at Parkville High School was 2074 students.

Athletics

State Championships
Boys Basketball
 Class 4A 2023

Boys Cross Country
Class A 1986
Girls Basketball
Combined Class 1973

Notable alumni
 Atif Qarni – Secretary of Education, Commonwealth of Virginia (2018–present)
 Artemy Lebedev – designer and businessman
 Maravene Loeschke – former president of Mansfield University & Towson University
 Michael G. Comeau – member of the Maryland House of Delegates (1997–99)
 Joe Cluster – member of the Maryland House of Delegates (2016–2019)
 Donna M. Felling – member of the Maryland House of Delegates
 Guy Guzzone – member of the Maryland House of Delegates and Maryland Senate (2007–2015, 2015–present)
 Dan Keplinger – artist who was featured in Oscar-winning documentary King Gimp
 Diane Geppi-Aikens – former women's lacrosse coach at Loyola College in Maryland
 Rusty Gerhardt – former professional Baseball pitcher for the San Diego Padres and current Texas Rangers Scout
 Kevin Palmer – former NBA player for the Washington Wizards and current international player
 Emil B. Pielke – former member of the Maryland House of Delegates

See also
List of Schools in Baltimore County, Maryland

References and notes

External links

 Parkville High School website 
 Baltimore County Public High School boundaries 

Public high schools in Maryland
Baltimore County Public Schools
Middle States Commission on Secondary Schools
Magnet schools in Maryland
Parkville, Maryland